Elizabeth North is a northern suburb of Adelaide, South Australia in the City of Playford. It is sandwiched between Main North Road to the east and the Gawler railway line to its west immediately north of Elizabeth and south of Smithfield. It is served by the Womma and Broadmeadows railway stations.

It was established in the late 1950s as a residential suburb of the planned City of Elizabeth. As for its neighbours including Elizabeth and Elizabeth South, it was configured as a local community around a small shopping centre containing a supermarket, bank, hotel and service station along with other shops.

References

Suburbs of Adelaide